Shriver is an occupational surname. The name derives from the Indo-European root word "shrive", which came to mean "to write", and which relates to multiple modern words, including in English scribe and scrivener and in German schreiben (to write). The surname Shriver may refer to:

People
Anthony Shriver (born 1965), American political activist
Bobby Shriver (born 1954), American politician
Brian Shriver (born 1987), American soccer player
Eunice Kennedy Shriver (1921–2009), American disability rights activist
Garner E. Shriver (1912–1998), American politician
Lionel Shriver (born 1957), American writer
Loren Shriver (born 1944), American astronaut
Maria Shriver (born 1955), American journalist
Mark D. Shriver (born 1965), American geneticist
Mark Kennedy Shriver (born 1964), American politician
Marley Shriver (born 1937), American swimmer
Pam Shriver (born 1962), American tennis player
Phillip Shriver (1922–2011), American historian
Sargent Shriver (1915–2011), American politician
Thomas H. Shriver (1846–1916), American politician
Timothy Shriver (born 1959), American nonprofit leader

Places
Shriver Center, Ohio
Shriver Covered Bridge, Pennsylvania
Shriver Farmstead, Illinois
Shriver House, Illinois
Shriver Homestead, Maryland

Other uses
Shriver (film), an upcoming comedy film starring Michael Shannon

See also
Schriver
Scriver

Occupational surnames
English-language occupational surnames